Cochise (1805–1874) was an Apache chief who led an uprising.

Cochise may also refer to:

 Cochise (album), an album by the band Cochise
 Cochise (band), a country rock band
 "Cochise" (song), a song by Audioslave
 "Cochise", a track from the Mike Oldfield album Guitars
 Cochise (rapper) (born 1998), a rapper known for the song "Tell Em"
 Martín Emilio Rodríguez (born 1942), Colombian road racing cyclist known as Cochise
 Cochise (crater), a crater in Taurus-Littrow valley on the Moon
 Cochise, Arizona, a town in Cochise County
 Cochise County, Arizona, a county in Arizona, United States
 Cochise Tradition, an archaeological culture
 Cochise, a character in the television series Falling Skies
 T-42 Cochise, a training version of the Beechcraft Baron aircraft